The third supplementary elections for the Legislative Yuan were held in the Republic of China (Taiwan) on 20 December 1975.

Compared with the second supplementary election the number of new delegates to the Legislative Yuan had been increased by one to 52, because of an increase in population. Of these, 37 were to be elected directly to represent Taiwan Province and the special municipality of Taipei. The remaining 15 seats were to represent overseas nationals and were appointed by the President.

Turnout for the supplementary election of the Legislative Yuan was 75.97% of 8,410,775 eligible votes. Of the 37 elected delegates, 30 belonged to the Kuomintang, one belonged to the Chinese Youth Party, and 6 were independent. All members chosen were born on Taiwan except for 5 delegates, who (or their parents) were from the Mainland.

Results

By constituency

References

Further reading
Copper, John F. and George P. Chen (1984), Taiwan’s Elections. Political Development and Democratization in the Republic of China, [Baltimore, Md.], Occasional Papers/Reprints Series in Contemporary Asian Studies, no. 5-1984 (64), 

Taiwan
Legislative elections in Taiwan
1975 elections in Taiwan